Kārlis Ozoliņš (born March 16, 1994) is a Latvian ice hockey player. He is currently a free agent.

Playing career
Ozoliņš began his hockey career playing in minor and junior Latvian hockey leagues. During 2011/12 and 2012/13 seasons he played for Liepājas Metalurgs in Latvian Hockey League and Belarusian Extraleague. On August 21, 2013 Ozoliņš signed a contract with Dinamo Rīga of the KHL.

International
Ozoliņš participated at the 2013 World Junior Ice Hockey Championships as a member of the Latvia men's national junior ice hockey team.

Career statistics

Regular season and playoffs

International

References

External links

1994 births
Living people
Latvian ice hockey left wingers
HK Liepājas Metalurgs players
HK Riga players
MHk 32 Liptovský Mikuláš players
Latvian expatriate sportspeople in Sweden
Latvian expatriate sportspeople in Slovakia
Expatriate ice hockey players in Sweden
Expatriate ice hockey players in Slovakia
Latvian expatriate ice hockey people